The Northeast Penang Island District is a district within the Malaysian state of Penang. The district covers the northeastern half of Penang Island, including the centre of George Town, Penang's capital city. The district borders the Southwest Penang Island District to the west.

History 

In 1786, the British East India Company had gained control of Penang Island, establishing the city of George Town at the island's northeastern tip. In the following decades, the entirety of the island was governed directly from George Town.

In 1888, the Southwest Penang Island District office was established in Balik Pulau at the southwest of the island, thus dividing the island into the Northeast and Southwest districts. Both districts on Penang Island first appeared in official maps dating back to the 1890s.

Geography 

The District and Land Office of Northeast Penang Island is situated within the heart of George Town, which is also the capital city of the State of Penang. In addition, the district covers the following suburbs of George Town.
 Batu Ferringhi
 Tanjung Bungah
 Tanjung Tokong
 Pulau Tikus
 Batu Lanchang
 Air Itam
 Paya Terubong
 Jelutong
 GelugorThe Northeast Penang Island District also includes much of Penang Island's central hill ranges. Penang Hill, the tallest peak on Penang Island, is within the district and serves as a major tourist attraction.

The Northeast Penang Island District is further divided into seven mukims.
 George Town
 Paya Terubong
 Bukit Paya Terubong
 Bukit Ayer Itam
 Ayer Itam
 Batu Ferringi
 Tanjong Tokong

Governance 
The District and Land Office is situated within Komtar, the tallest skyscraper in Penang.

Local government 

Although the districts in Malaysia were created for the purpose of land administration and revenue, in practice, it is the local government that ensures the provision of basic amenities and maintenance of urban infrastructure.

Notably, both districts on Penang Island are under the jurisdiction of the Penang Island City Council, which is also based in the centre of George Town. With a history dating back to 1800, it is the oldest local authority in Malaysia. The current Mayor of Penang Island is Yew Tung Seang, who was appointed into the position by the Penang state government in 2018. The Mayor's term lasts for two years.

Electoral constituencies

Demographics

The following is based on the 2020 Malaysian Census conducted by Malaysia's Department of Statistics.

Education 

The district is where some of the oldest schools in Malaysia were established. Penang Free School, founded in 1816, is the oldest English school in Southeast Asia, as well as the first of several missionary schools in the city. These English-medium schools, including St. Xavier's Institution, St. George's Girls School and Methodist Boys' School have produced some of Malaysia's most influential figures, including lawmakers, politicians, professionals and businessmen.

In addition, the first Chinese schools in Malaysia were established within the district. Since then, Chinese schools like Chung Ling High School, Heng Ee High School and Penang Chinese Girls' High School have maintained strong reputations based on academic excellence.

International schools have also been established within the city to cater to the growing expatriate population. These schools offer primary to secondary education up to A Levels and International Baccalaureate.

In terms of tertiary education, the district is home to one of the best Malaysian public universities - Universiti Sains Malaysia, as well as several private colleges and institutions such as Wawasan Open University, SEGi College and Han Chiang College.

The Penang State Library operates a branch and a children's library within the district.

Health care 

In recent years, George Town has become the medical tourism centre of Malaysia, generating about 70% of the country's medical tourism revenue and attracting approximately half of medical tourist arrivals into the country. The numerous public and private hospitals in the district, coupled with low cost of living and ease of travel have helped facilitate the medical tourism boom.

The Penang General Hospital is the main public hospital for George Town and the district. Built in 1882, it also serves as the reference hospital within northern Malaysia.

Private hospitals, including Penang Adventist Hospital and Lam Wah Ee Hospital, also offer advanced facilities and speedier care by well-trained professionals. These hospitals cater not only to the local population but also patients from other states and neighbouring countries such as Indonesia and Singapore.

Transportation

Land 

The district is linked with the Malay Peninsula via the Penang Bridge, which runs between the George Town suburb of Gelugor and Perai on the mainland.

George Town has a relatively well-developed road network stretching back to the early days of British colonisation. Within the city centre are narrow streets and lanes, while modern arterial roads connect the city centre with the suburbs such as Tanjung Tokong, Air Itam and Jelutong.

The Tun Dr Lim Chong Eu Expressway runs along the eastern coastline of Penang Island between the city centre and the Penang International Airport, linking both locations with the Bayan Lepas Free Industrial Zone and the Penang Bridge.

Federal Route 6 is a winding trunk road that serves as the pan-island road, forming a circular loop round Penang Island. In the clockwise direction, this road connects the city centre with Bayan Lepas, Balik Pulau and Teluk Bahang.

Public transportation throughout Penang Island is composed of buses operated by Rapid Penang. In recent years, a free shuttle service within the city centre and double decker buses for tourists have also been introduced.

The district also has the only operational railway on Penang Island - the Penang Hill Railway. It is the oldest funicular rail system in Malaysia, having commenced operations in 1923. It was last upgraded in 2011 with new coaches that take as little as five minutes to reach the peak of Penang Hill.

Sea 

The Port of Penang consists of four terminals, one of which is located within the district. The Swettenham Pier serves not only cruise ships, but also on occasion, warships as well.

In addition, the Penang Ferry Service operates across the Penang Strait between George Town and Butterworth on the Malay Peninsula. At present, four ferries ply the route between George Town and Butterworth daily.

Tourist attractions 

A great majority of Penang's tourist attractions lie within the centre of George Town. The city centre, a UNESCO World Heritage Site, is well-renowned for its architectural, cultural and culinary varieties; George Town is also said to be the food capital of Malaysia. In addition, the district has a number of natural attractions ranging from the central hills of Penang Island to the sandy beaches along the island's northern coastline.

Listed below are just some of the landmarks within the Northeast Penang Island District.

See also

 Districts of Malaysia

References

 
1888 establishments in British Malaya